Hexafluorophosphazene is an inorganic compound with the formula . It takes the form of a white powder or lumps. It is sensitive to moisture and heat.

Structure
The molecule has a cyclic, unsaturated backbone consisting of alternating phosphorus and nitrogen centers, and can be viewed as a trimer of the hypothetical compound . Its classification as a phosphazene highlights its relationship to benzene. Hexafluorophosphazene has a hexagonal  ring with six equivalent P–N bonds. Each phosphorus atom is additionally bonded to two fluorine atoms.

The molecule possesses D3h symmetry, and each phosphorus center is tetrahedral.

The  ring in hexachlorophosphazene deviates from planarity and is slightly ruffled (see chair conformation). By contrast, the  ring in hexafluorophosphazene is completely planar.

References

Fluorides
Nitrogen heterocycles
Inorganic compounds
Nitrides
Phosphorus heterocycles
Six-membered rings
Phosphazenes